Gōnoyama Tōki (Japanese: 豪ノ山 登輝, born April 07, 1998, as Nishikawa Toki (	西川 登輝, Nishikawa Toki)) is a Japanese professional sumo wrestler from Neyagawa, Osaka. Wrestling for Takekuma stable, he made his professional debut in March 2021. He reached the second-highest jūryō division in July 2022. His highest rank has been jūryō 10.

Early life and sumo background
Nishikawa began sumo wrestling during his first year at Keimei Elementary School in Neyagawa, Osaka, and he participated three consecutive years in the Wanpaku Sumo Tournament and the All Japan Elementary School Sumo Championship from the fourth grade to the sixth grade.  He went on to attend Neyagawa Shiritsu Daikyu Junior High School and Saitama Sakae High School before enrolling at the Faculty of Law in Chuo University. During his first year at Chuo University, Nishikawa made it to the top 32 in the National Student Championships. By his fourth year, he was captain of his university's sumo club and he also finished runner-up at the National Student Championships. After graduating from college, Nishikawa opted to turn pro and joined Sakaigawa stable.

Career

Early career
He made his professional debut in March 2021 as a deshi of fellow Neyagawa native Takekuma Oyakata. Due to his amateur achievements, Nishikawa was given sandanme tsukedashi status, alongside fellow collegiate standout and Chu-Dai teammate , which allowed him to make his professional debut at the bottom of sandanme. In his first tournament, Nishikawa was undefeated coming into his final match, including a win over Tochi but,  sadly he would miss out on the yusho after losing to Fukushima by disqualification as he had pulled his topknot. Nevertheless, he followed with another strong 6-1 record and was promoted to makushita in July 2021. In November 2021, Nishikawa withdrew from the tournament due to a neck injury and was demoted to the rank of makushita 35 in January 2022. In his return, Nishikawa defeated former komusubi Ryūden in his final match to claim the makushita yusho with a perfect 7-0 record. In February 2022, he would transfer to the recently opened Takekuma stable opened by former Ozeki Gōeidō. He followed this with two 4-3 records and was promoted to jūryō in July 2022.

Jūryō Career
Upon his promotion to jūryō, he was given the new shikona Gōnoyama (豪ノ山) taking the first kanji from his Oyakata's. He finished with an 8-7 record in his jūryō debut.

Fighting style
Gōnoyama is a tsuki and oshi specialist, which means he relies on thrusting and pushing techniques to defeat his opponents rather than belt-wrestling. By far the most common of his winning techniques is oshidashi which accounts for 42% of his wins.

Career record

See also
Glossary of sumo terms
List of active sumo wrestlers

References

External links

1998 births
Living people
Japanese sumo wrestlers
Sumo people from Osaka Prefecture